The 2017–18 UT Arlington Mavericks men's basketball team represented the University of Texas at Arlington during the 2017–18 NCAA Division I men's basketball season. The Mavericks, led by 12th-year head coach Scott Cross, played their home games at the College Park Center as members of the Sun Belt Conference. They finished the season 21–13, 10–8 in Sun Belt play to finish in fourth place. They defeated Appalachian State and Louisiana to advance to the championship game of the Sun Belt tournament where they lost to Georgia State. Despite having 21 wins, they did not participate in a postseason tournament.

On March 26, 2018, Cross was fired after 12 seasons at UT Arlington, along with his entire staff, with UTA's Athletic Director citing a change in the program's leadership. On April 6, the school hired former Texas Tech assistant Chris Ogden as head coach.

Previous season
The Mavericks finished the 2016–17 season 27–9, 14–4 in Sun Belt play to win the Sun Belt regular season championship. In the Sun Belt tournament, they defeated Coastal Carolina before losing in the semifinals to Texas State. As a regular season conference champion who failed to win their conference tournament, they received an automatic bid to the National Invitation Tournament. There they defeated BYU and Akron before losing in the quarterfinals to Cal State Bakersfield.

Offseason 

Under NCAA transfer rules, Barrett and Dennis will have to sit out for the 2017–18 season.  Barrett will have three seasons of eligibility remaining, while Dennis will have two seasons.

Roster

Schedule and results

|-
!colspan=12 style=| Exhibition

|-
!colspan=12 style=| Non-conference regular season

|-
!colspan=12 style=| Sun Belt Conference regular season

|-
!colspan=9 style=| Sun Belt tournament

References

2017-18
2017–18 Sun Belt Conference men's basketball season
2017 in sports in Texas
2018 in sports in Texas